A.I.C.O. -Incarnation- is a Japanese science fiction original net animation (ONA) anime series produced by Bones. The series premiered worldwide on Netflix on March 9, 2018. A manga adaptation by Hiroaki Michiaki has run in Monthly Shōnen Sirius since November 25, 2017, and has been licensed by Kodansha USA.

Plot
In 2035, a biological research project to create an Artificial and Intelligent Cellular Organism (A.I.C.O.) went awry, resulting in an incident called the "Burst" which transformed Kurobe Gorge into a quarantine area infested by a rampant growth of synthetic organisms called Matter. Two years later, high school student Aiko Tachibana finds that she may be the duplicate of a girl trapped within the Matter whose family disappeared in the Burst. An enigmatic fellow student Yuya Kanzaki offers to solve the mystery by taking her with a group of professional Divers to the Primary Point which was the center of the Burst.

Characters

A cheerful, energetic girl. After losing her family in the Burst, she was mortally wounded and her brain was installed in an artificial body. She meets a new transfer student named Yuya Kanzaki and shocked by what he tells her about her family and her own body. She decides to join forces with Yuya to recover her family.

A new student at Aiko's school and the other protagonist of the series with a mature and aloof demeanor. He tells Aiko the truth about her reconstruction and joins the Divers to reach Primary Point. His objective is to put an end to the Burst, but much about him is shrouded in mystery. However, it is later revealed that he is Toshihide Yura, one of the doctors and researchers at Kiryu Biotech Research Facility who died on the start of the 'Burst" incident, and whose brain was implanted in an artificial organism called the "Duplicate One" by Susumu Kurose, who somehow was able to salvage Yura's body.

Leader of the Divers and Shiraishi's partner. Despite his tough and intimidating appearance, he is gentle and mild-mannered. Driven by a strong sense of responsibility, he always puts the needs of his team members first. He gathered his team in response to Kurose's request.

One of the Divers and Shinoyama's partner. Kind, gentle and easygoing, she supports Shinoyama and the team with meticulous attention to everything ranging from vehicle operation and maintenance to making arrangements for food supplies.

One of the Divers and Kazuki's partner. Once a member of a military special forces unit, he is highly skilled in combat. He has the ability to calmly make decisions based on the situation and take appropriate action. He can be strict at times with Kazuki, but is a caring and reliable older brother type. He is deadly with any weapon, from heavy firearms to knives.

One of the Divers and Sagami's partner. While he is a relatively new Diver, he makes up for his lack of experience with spirit and enthusiasm. He uses his talents in electronics to support his partner Sagami. He has a prosthetic right hand based on artificial life form technology.

One of the Divers and Kaede's partner. Cool-headed, beautiful and intelligent. Before the Burst, she was an artificial life form researcher. Well-versed in scientific equipment, she prefers efficient tactics that leverage her prior experience in sharp contrast to her partner Kaede's reliance on intuition. She shows strong interest in Malignant Matter.

One of the Divers and Haruka's partner. Blessed with exceptional physical abilities and animal-like intuition. She specializes in close quarters combat and preemptive strikes. Her words are often direct and impulsive, appearing as straightforward or alternatively inconsiderate and rough.

One of the artificial life form researchers at the Kiryu Biotech Research Facility. Developer of the "Cell Assembler" technology. He has an easygoing, carefree persona, but is willing to take some risks to achieve his objectives. He provides support to Yuya and Aiko from outside the area. He and Isazu were in the same year in college, and Nanbara was one year ahead of them.

Head of Kiryu Hospital and the doctor in charge of Aiko's care. Like Kurose, he is part of the Kiryu Biotech Research Facility. As one of the artificial life form researchers, he developed the "Carbon Nanostructure" technology. His only daughter, Yuzuha, is in a coma following an accident and he struggles with his inability to find a way to treat her.

Chief of the CAAC (Control Agency of Artificial Creatures) Response Bureau and a central figure in the government's efforts to promote artificial life form technology. She supports the effort to recover research results from the area infested by Malignant Matter. She has known Isazu and Kurose since college.

Voice cast

Production
Internet streaming service Netflix announced the series during their "Netflix Anime Slate 2017" event on August 2, 2017, as well as their plans to release it simultaneously worldwide in spring 2018. The announcement was part of Netflix's plan to introduce more original content onto their platform in 2018, including 30 new anime series. The series is directed by Kazuya Murata at studio Bones. Bones had previously filed a trademark for the title on April 27, 2017, which covered anime, games, and merchandise.

The series is written by Yuuichi Nomura with character designs by manga artist Hanaharu Naruko. Chief animation director Satoshi Ishino is adapting the designs for animation. The rest of the design team includes Tomoaki Okada, who provides concept designs, Takeshi Takakura, in charge of mechanical designs, and Kazuhiro Miwa, who provides matter designs. Junichi Higashi is the series' art director, Reiko Iwasawa serves as color key artist, and Kōki Ōta serves as CGI director. Hikaru Fukuda is the director of photography, while Kumiko Sakamoto is the editor for the anime. UTAMARO Movement is producing the sound under sound director Jin Aketagawa, with sound effects created by Tomoji Furuya.

The music for the series is composed by Taro Iwashiro and produced by music recording company Lantis. The opening theme song, "A.I.C.O.", is performed by Japanese singer True, and the ending theme song, is performed by Haruka Shiraishi, who voices Aiko Tachibana.

Release
The 12-episode series is an original net animation (ONA), and premiered worldwide exclusively on Netflix on March 9, 2018. Originally dubbed in English by Seoul-based Iyuno Media Group, the series was redubbed by Bang Zoom! Entertainment in October 2018.

Episodes

Reception
A.I.C.O. -Incarnation- received average to positive reviews from critics and audiences. IGN contributor Shuka Yamada gave the series a rating of 7.5 out of a possible 10, writing that the series was a, "Meticulously crafted sci-fi anime with some pretty major ups and downs ". Theron Martin of The Anime News Network gave the series sub a rating of "B+" and the dub a "B−", praising the cohesive storytelling and production value, but criticized its English dubbing. Setsuken, the owner of website Anime-Evo, praised the series in a review of the series, writing, "Its nothing transcendent, but there’s a confidence and a display of clear skill in how it takes some tried and true concepts that we haven’t seen in years, and effortlessly brings them back for the current modern age." In contrast, Kayla Cobb of Decider, gave the series a deeply negative review, referring to it as a knock off of Ghost in the Shell.

Other media
The original soundtrack for the series, including both of the theme songs and the series' background music, was released on a two-disc CD set on March 28, 2018.

A manga adaptation by Hiroaki Michiaki launched in Kodansha's shōnen manga magazine Monthly Shōnen Sirius on November 25, 2017. Kodansha USA has licensed the series for digital publication.

Notes

References

External links
  
  
 A.I.C.O. -Incarnation- on Netflix
 

2018 anime ONAs
Anime with original screenplays
Bandai Namco franchises
Bones (studio)
Japanese-language Netflix original programming
Kodansha manga
Netflix original anime
Science fiction anime and manga
Shōnen manga